Happy Tears is a 2009 American independent comedy-drama film by Mitchell Lichtenstein. It stars Parker Posey, Demi Moore, Rip Torn, Sebastian Roché , Ellen Barkin, and Billy Magnussen. The film premiered at the Berlin International Film Festival on February 11, 2009. and was released theatrically in the United States on February 19, 2010.

Plot

Jayne and Laura play sisters helping their crude but endearing father Joe deal with age-related health and mental problems. Wealthy by marriage, Jayne is otherwise psychologically fragile. Conversely, Laura has her hands full with domestic responsibilities but is considerably more grounded. Upon returning to their childhood home to help their father, they face difficult, frequently comic situations. The home, their deceased mother's effects, and their father's eccentricities evoke memories and sentiments, especially for Jayne. The sisters bicker over the seriousness of their father's condition. They also contend with a romantic dalliance between Joe and his equally eccentric, wigged-out "nurse" Shelly. The struggle to balance familial duties with their own strained lives suggests a more meaningful family connection they may not have had as children.

Cast

Production
The shooting schedule was completed in 2008 and included locations in and around Philadelphia including Prospect Park, Center City and Cabrini College.

Reception
On review aggregator website Rotten Tomatoes, the film holds a 27% rank based on 33 reviews, with an average rating of 4.4/10. The site's consensus states: "Replete with quirky indie clichés, Happy Tears wastes some fine performances from Demi Moore, Parker Posey, and Rip Torn on stale formula". On Metacritic, the film has a weighted average score of 35 out of a 100 based on 17 critics, indicating "generally unfavorable reviews".

Noel Murray of The A.V. Club described Happy Tears as "a complete mess of a movie", but also mentioning that "Lichtenstein conjures some sweet moments and striking metaphors".

Michael Phillips of the Chicago Tribune wrote that "[the film] settles for the usual moments, even at its quirkiest".

In an interview for The New York Times, Manohla Dargis said that "writer and director Mitchell Lichtenstein struggles to find the humor in a host of horrors".

According to Leslie Felperin of Variety magazine, the film is "a contradictory creature, both insightful and dumb".

Slant Magazines  Nick Schager gave the film a half star explaining his reasoning for it as "[Happy Tears] succeeds only at suggesting the incompatibility of returning-home dramedy and surrealistic flights of fancy". David Fear of Time Out managed to give a film at least one star, writing "Not even the reliable Posey can salvage this slag heap".

Melissa Anderson of The Village Voice wrote "Other than the guest-starring appearance of Cy Twombly canvases, nothing distinguishes this poor relation of The Savages from all the other emotionally fraudulent Amerindies about familial dysfunction and reconciliation".

Despite all the negative criticism of the film, Roger Ebert of the Chicago Sun-Times praised the film, calling Demi Moore's role as "kind of calm", "attractive", as well as "dialed-down" and "capable woman".

References

External links

2009 comedy-drama films
American independent films
Films shot in Pennsylvania
Roadside Attractions films
American comedy-drama films
2009 independent films
Films about father–daughter relationships
Films about sisters
2000s English-language films
2000s American films